The Seton Hall Pirates baseball team represents Seton Hall University, in South Orange, New Jersey in college baseball. The program is classified in the NCAA Division I, and the team competes in the Big East Conference. The team is coached by Rob Sheppard.

The Seton Hall baseball team has been to the College World Series four times, recorded 16 NCAA appearances, and 4 Big East Championships (three tournament and one regular season).

Facilities
The Pirates play home games at Owen T. Carroll Field, an 1,800 seat stadium which has been home to the program since 1907.

Head coaches

References